Nathan Banks (April 13, 1868 – January 24, 1953) was an American entomologist noted for his work on Neuroptera, Megaloptera, Hymenoptera, and Acarina (mites). He started work on mites in 1880 with the USDA. In 1909 he reported many Costa Rican species with several new species saying "During the past few years the writer has received large series of spiders and daddy-longlegs from Costa Rica for identification". In 1915 he authored the first comprehensive English handbook on mites: A Treatise on the Acarina, Or Mites (Smithsonian Institution, Proceedings Of The United States National Museum, 1905, 114 pages).

Banks left the USDA in 1916 to work at the Museum of Comparative Zoology (MCZ) where he did further work on Hymenoptera, Arachnida and Neuroptera. He was elected a Fellow of the American Academy of Arts and Sciences in 1922.

In 1924, he spent about two months in Panama, through kindness of Dr. Thomas Barbour and in company with Dr. W.M. Wheeler. Between mid June and mid August they divided time between forested regions on Barro Colorado Island and more open habitat at various points along the railroad in the vicinity of Panama City (See Banks, 1929 "Spiders of Panama" for details).

He authored more than 440 technical works over the years 1890 to 1951. He was married to Mary A. Lu Gar and they had eight children. (One son was named Gilbert, but no other offspring are known by name.)

References

 Carpenter, F. M. & P. J. Darlington, Jr. 1954. Nathan Banks, A biographic sketch and list of publications. Psyche, vol. 61, pp. 81–110.

External links
 PDF linked here
 US National Mite Collection History—accessed 25 April 2007
 Nathan BANKS - papers on Opiliones—accessed 25 April 2007
 New England Naturalists: A Bio-Bibliography—lists obituaries in professional journals—accessed 25 April 2007
 Checklist and Bibliography of the Megaloptera and Neuroptera of Florida—representative publications by Banks on neuroptera and megaloptera—accessed 25 April 2007
 MCZ Entomology Department—discusses work on hymenoptera—accessed 25 April 2007
 
 

1868 births
1953 deaths
People from Roslyn, New York
American entomologists
American arachnologists
Hymenopterists
Cornell University alumni
Fellows of the American Academy of Arts and Sciences
Scientists from New York (state)